The 1988 Soviet Cup Final was a football match that took place at the Lenin's Central Stadium, Moscow on May 28, 1988. The match was the 47th Soviet Cup Final and it was contested by FC Metalist Kharkiv and FC Torpedo Moscow. The Soviet Cup winner Metalist qualified for the Cup Winners' Cup first round for the Soviet Union. The last year defending holders Dynamo Kyiv were eliminated in the second round of the competition by FC Rotor Volgograd (3:2, 0:2). For Metalist this was their second final total and second in five years. For Torpedo it was their 13th Cup Final and the seventh loss at this stage.

Road to Moscow 

All sixteen Soviet Top League clubs did not have to go through qualification to get into the competition, so Metalist and Torpedo both qualified for the competition automatically.

Previous Encounters 
Previously they only met six times with Torpedo winning four and Metalist once, the goals were 6 to 2 respectively. The very first time they met each other on July 26, 1936, at the Round of 16 when Torpedo (then - ZiS) playing home was victorious 2:0 (Metalist was called as KhPZ). The last encounter was three seasons ago when in the first round Torpedo once again defeated Metalist in overtime playing at home.

Match details

MATCH OFFICIALS 
Assistant referees:
 V.Zhuk (Minsk)
 A.Khokhryakov (Yoshkar-Ola)
Fourth official: 

MATCH RULES
90 minutes.
30 minutes of extra-time if necessary.
Penalty shoot-out if scores still level.
Seven named substitutes
Maximum of 3 substitutions.

See also
 Soviet Top League 1987

References

External links 
Torpedo Moscow unofficial website
The competition calendar

1988
Cup
Soviet Cup Final 1988
Soviet Cup Final 1988
May 1988 sports events in Europe
1988 in Moscow